Marcos Lutyens (born 1964) is a British interdisciplinary artist and author based in Los Angeles, California. His artworks seek to disrupt internalized patterns of thinking, associations, and ways of existing in the world through exhibitions and performances. He is a relative of the architect Sir Edwin Lutyens, the writer Mary Lutyens, and the composer Elizabeth Lutyens.

Work 
Lutyens' projects have been exhibited internationally and center on explorations of sensory perception and the unconscious mind. He frequently uses hypnosis as a part of his performances. Lutyens collaborates with artists, writers, and scientists on his projects. His interests in sensory perception and synesthesia have led him to collaborate with neuroscientist Richard Cytowic, as well as neuroscientist Vilayanur Ramachandran. He has also worked closely with The Institute for Art and Olfaction on various projects, using specially created scents as a means of enhancing and deepening the experiences of his performance works. In addition, Lutyens has worked extensively with sensory impaired communities including the Association of Persons with Visual Impairments in Turkey and the Latvian Society of the Blind. Lutyens has also collaborated with organizations including Vision Forum, the International Association of Synaesthetes, Artists, and Scientists.

Hypnotic Show 
Hypnotic Show is an evolving project created in collaboration with Raimundas Malašauskas. It has been shown in various iterations, performed at dOCUMENTA (13), in Kassel, Germany in 2012. Performances of Hypnotic Show at dOCUMENTA (13) were held in a cabin, specially designed by Lutyens, called the Reflecting Room. A near exact replica of the upper cabin was installed below, upside down, so that the floor of the cabin appeared to be covered in a mirror. Even when visitors realized that the bottom floor of the cabin was not a mirror, their minds still saw it as such. Within this mirrored space, Lutyens held 340 hypnotic performances over 100 days, with 7,000 people in attendance. Scripts for these performances were adapted from Raimundas Malašauskas’ book, Paper Exhibition along with contributions from various artists. Special scents, designed by Sissel Tolaas, were also released into the space in order to deepen the experience.

An instance of Hypnotic Show was performed at the Solomon R. Guggenheim Museum in New York City as a part of the exhibition Tales of Our Time in 2017. A video was also produced along with this performance. Previous events have involved scripts by artists and writers, including Pierre Huyghe, Joachim Koester, John Menick, Sofía Hernández Chong Cuy, Carey Young, Etienne Chambaud and Robert Barry.

Rose River Memorial 
Rose River Memorial is a public art installation commemorating the lives lost to COVID-19. It was started by Lutyens and the writer and scholar Tilly Hinton. In a process of collective grieving, members of the public create handmade roses out of felt, which are hung together on netting at the memorial. Each rose corresponds to a life lost. The first location of the project was installed in Boyle Heights, a neighborhood in East Los Angeles heavily impacted by the virus.

The Inductive Museum 
The Inductive Museum was a performance piece presented Culture Summit in Abu Dhabi in 2019. Lutyens was invited as a keynote artist by curators Alexandra Munroe and Xiaorui Zhu-Nowell of the Guggenheim, to open the summit towards the theme of Cultural Responsibility and New Technology. Hypnotized visitors engaged in a variety of sensory experiences, including touch, smell, and sight, in order to elicit visions of a museum that existed within the psyche.

CO2morrow 
CO2morrow is a reactive sculpture, first shown at the Royal Academy of Arts in London as a part of the show, “Earth: Art of a Changing World” in 2009. The project was created in collaboration with artist Alessandro Marianantoni and climate scientist Andrew Manning. Inspired by Timothy Morton’s idea of the hyperobject, CO2morrow approaches climate change as an issue of consciousness. The sculpture is created almost entirely out of carbon fiber and is modeled after a scrubber molecule that takes CO2 out of the air, based on research by chemist Omar Yaghi. The sculpture is also covered in LED lights that react in real time to data received from a network of sensing technologies in the United Kingdom. During the project, the Climate Research Unit at the University of East Anglia, who were helping Lutyens and his team collect data, were hacked in Climategate, an email leak that attempted to expose climate science as a conspiracy. After its showing at the Royal Academy of Arts, CO2morrow was moved to Seaton Delaval Hall, on the northeast coast of the England.

Neurathian Boatstrap 
Neurathian Boatstrap is a multimedia installation displayed in 2015 at the 14th Istanbul Biennial, “SALT WATER: A Theory of Thought Forms” curated by Carolyn Christov-Bakargiev. The entire piece was housed inside and as a part of a two-story boat. The title of the project derives from Neurath’s boat, a metaphor central to anti-foundational explanations of knowledge, first formulated by the Austrian philosopher Otto Neurath. Lutyens used various objects to reframe sensory experiences: Chladni plates show the sound of the voices of a blind community that Lutyens collaborated with; large sea stones and their ceramic casts present a kind of “braille” of the sea. The hypnotic scripts for the project were derived from three novels, Asli Erdoğan’s The City in Crimson Cloak (1998), J.G. Ballard’s The Crystal World (1966), and René Daumal’s Mount Analog (1952). Lutyens also presented video pieces he created about impossible colors, those colors that are not usually perceivable between red and green, yellow and blue.

Phobophobia 
Phobophobia is a project that addresses the fear of fear. It was performed at “ATARAXIA,” curated by Koyo Kouoh, for the Salon Suisse at the 57th Venice Biennale in 2017. The performance uses hypnotism along with specially designed sculptures to open up and release fear through the process of discharge. By externalizing fear, Lutyens sought to assist visitors in releasing trauma as it exists in the body. Throughout the duration of the performance, special smells designed by Stephen Douthwaite were released to transition the frame of mind, enhancing and furthering goals of the hypnotic induction.

Color Therapy 
Color Therapy is an installation presented on large LED screens simultaneously in six cities around the world over the course of a year. The project was presented in key public locations such as Times Square (New York), Piccadilly Circus (London) Amsterdam, Milan, Toronto and Singapore in 2014. The project explored the ways in which color can expand and effect consciousness through hypnotic visuals. Short 60-second films were played on the screens, reacting in real time to local weather data. The colors of each film related to an inverse of the current weather, creating emotional warmth when it’s cold, wet or windy, and a feeling of calm when it’s hot, dry or still. An iteration of the project was presented as Soma Chroma at Piccadilly Circus and Dubai Dubia at Zayed University in Dubai as a part of ISEA 2014, and K-Tanglement in New York, Toronto, Milan, and Amsterdam.

Literature 
Lutyens wrote a book, published by Sternberg Press recounting his dOCUMENTA (13) experience titled, 100 Days: Memoirs of a Hypnotist.

References

External links 

 

Living people
1964 births
Artists from London
Artists from Los Angeles
English performance artists